Adoxophyes perstricta is a species of moth of the family Tortricidae first described by Edward Meyrick in 1928. It is found from the Philippines to New Guinea, New Britain and Java.

References

Moths described in 1928
Adoxophyes
Moths of Asia
Moths of Oceania